Nothing But The Blood of Jesus is a traditional American hymn about the blood atonement and propitiation for sin by the death of Jesus as explained in Hebrews 9. The song was composed by Robert Lowry, a hymn writer who was a Baptist minister and professor at Bucknell University.

The song was written in 1876 and first popularized at a camp meeting in Ocean Grove, New Jersey. The song has been covered by many notable musicians including Randy Travis and Carrie Underwood.

Lyrics

The final two verses

References

American Christian hymns
Gospel songs
Hymns by Robert Lowry
Music of New Jersey
Music of Pennsylvania
Protestant hymns
Public domain music
Songs about Jesus
1876 songs
19th-century hymns